Simona may refer to:

 1033 Simona, a main-belt asteroid
 Simona (given name), a feminine given name of Hebrew origin
 Simona (TV series), a 2018 Argentine telenovela
 Simona (cicada), a genus of cicadas

See also
 Simon (disambiguation)
 Simone (disambiguation)